Sweet Women Lie is a crime novel by Loren D. Estleman. The book is set in Detroit, Michigan and was first published in 1990. The book is the eleventh of a series and the main character is Amos Walker, a private detective. The series has established itself in the genre and runs to at least 15 titles.

Plot summary
In this episode, Walker's ex-wife has a new boyfriend, who she cannot find. She employs Amos Walker in the search, but the new "beau" has a secret life as a government assassin. The events of the book unfold from there, at whatever pace it continues to be read at.

Footnotes

References
Amos Walker stories

1990 American novels
American crime novels
Novels set in Detroit
Houghton Mifflin books